Narchyang waterfall (Nepali:नारच्याङ्ग झरना) lies along the Annapurna trekking trail,  in Annapurna Rural Municipality in Myagdi district.

The fall lies at an elevation of 1400 m. The fall height is about 300m. A temple of Bhumethan is located near the waterfall where pilgrimage pays visit in the months of Jestha and Asar.

See also
List of waterfalls of Nepal

References

Waterfalls of Nepal